Fnar or FNAR may refer to:
FNAR, a French terrorist group
The FN FNAR rifle